The 1st Infantry Division (Indonesian: Divisi Infanteri 1 Kostrad) abbreviated "Divif 1/Kostrad", is an army strategic command division of the Indonesian Army. The divisional commander is a two-star major general.

The division was founded on 22 December 1965 as the Airborne Component of the Army Strategic Command (Komando Tempur Lintas Udara Kostrad).
The division contains multiple army combat units including infantry (Airborne, Mechanized, and Raider), Cavalry (now can be categorized as Armor units), Artillery, and other support units. It is known as a Combined arms division.

Organization

 

The division is composed of 3 Infantry Brigades, 1 Artillery Regiment and supporting elements including independent Battalion units, and Companies under the division ORBAT. The 3rd Para Raider Infantry Brigade was part of the Kostrad 1st Infantry Division but was later moved to a new division known as the Kostrad 3rd Infantry Division  based on the Decree of the President of the Republic of Indonesia Number 12 of 2018 dated May 8, 2018.

The 1st Battalion Combat Team, raised 2017, was transformed into the basis of a 3rd mechanized brigade - the 14th Mechanized Raider Infantry Brigade - effective 17 November 2022.

See also
 2nd Kostrad Infantry Division
 3rd Kostrad Infantry Division

Notes

Further reading
'Indonesia: Keeping its forces at full stretch,' Jane's Defence Weekly, 15 April 1998, p. 34-35

External links
http://kostrad.mil.id/divisi-1/

Divisions of Indonesia
Infantry divisions
Military units and formations established in 1965
Indonesian Army